André Bonnaire (1 February 1901, Landrecies – 21 July 1962) was a French politician. He represented the Radical Party in the National Assembly from 1956 to 1958.

References

1901 births
1962 deaths
People from Nord (French department)
Politicians from Hauts-de-France
Radical Party (France) politicians
Deputies of the 3rd National Assembly of the French Fourth Republic